The  are demonlike beings portrayed by men wearing hefty oni (ogre) masks and traditional straw capes (mino) during a New Year's ritual, in local northern Japanese folklore of the Oga Peninsula area of Akita Prefecture.

General description

The frightfully dressed men impersonating the oni-demons wearing masks, dressed in long straw coats or mino, locally called kede or kende.

Traditionally, the namahage have worn painted wooden masks, sometimes made of wood bark, and primarily painted red. But in recent years they have been manufactured using bamboo strainers as frames, cardboard material, or flattened metal canisters, etc., and the namahage may travel in pairs, one red-faced, the other blue-faced, in the hamlet of Yumoto (incorporated into the city of Oga), for example.

The straw attire are often described as a mino (standard Japanese), but these are considered particular items of clothing known locally as kede (or ke　nde; kedashi).

Etymology
The namahage's purpose was to admonish laggards who sit around the fire idly doing nothing useful. Folklorist literature such as Ine mention hidako, but not the precise medical term for it. A rashlike condition caused by overexposure to fire, from sitting by the dugout irori hearth. Thus "fire rash peeling" is generally believed to be the derivation of the name namahage.

Tradition
Although the namahage are nowadays conceived of as a type of  oni or ogre, it was originally a custom where youngsters impersonated the kami who made visitations during the New Year's season. Thus it is a kind of toshigami.

The practice has shifted over the years.

According to 20th century descriptions, the namahage would typically receive mochi (rice cakes) from the households they visited, but newlywed couples were supposed to play host to them in full formal attire and offer them sake and food. The namahage still receive hospitality in likewise manner during the New Years, but in a reversal of roles, the namahage distribute mochi to visitors (tourists) during the  held in February.

Season
This is a New Year's ritual, and the namahage visits nowadays take place on New Year's Eve (using the Western calendar). But it used to be practiced on the so-called , the first full moon night of the year. This is the 15th day of the first lunar calendrical year, which is not the same thing as January 15; it usually falls around mid-February, exactly two weeks after the Chinese New Year.

Dialogue or phraseology
The knife apparently signified the instrument to peel the blisters, and it was customary to have azuki gruel on the "Little New Year".

Legend

The legend of the Namahage varies according to an area. These oni stole crops and young women from Oga's villages.

The citizens of Oga wagered the demons that if they could build a flight of stone steps, one thousand steps in all, from the village to the five shrine halls (variant: from the sea shore to the top of Mt. Shinzan) all in one night, then the villagers will supply them with a young woman every year. But if they failed the task they would have to leave. Just as the ogres were about to complete the work, a villager mimicked the cry of a rooster, and the ogres departed, believing they had failed.

Interpretations
An obvious purpose of the festival is to encourage young children to obey their parents and to behave. Parents know who the Namahage actors are each year and might request them to teach specific lessons to their children during their visit. The Namahage repeat the lessons to the children before leaving the house.

Some ethnologists and folklorists suggest it relates to a belief in deities (or spirits) coming from abroad to take away misfortune and bring blessings for the new year, while others believe it to be an agricultural custom where the kami from the sacred mountains visit.

Similar ogre traditions
The tradition where the ogres are called namahage occurs in the Oga Peninsula area of Akita Prefecture.

Although the namahage of Oga has become the foremost recognized, cognate traditions occur in other regions throughout Japan, :
 Yamahage in the former Yūwa, Akita, now part of Akita, Akita.
  of Noshiro, Akita.
  of Yamagata prefecture.
  of Ishikawa prefecture.
  of Fukui prefecture.
 , Anmo, Nagomi or Nagomihakuri in northern Iwate prefecture.
  in Ehime Prefecture (Shikoku)
, parallel practice in Koshikijima Islands, Kagoshima prefecture
, a parallel but secretive practice of the Yaeyama Islands, Okinawa

See also
List of Important Intangible Folk Cultural Properties
List of legendary creatures from Japan
Japanese mythology in popular culture
Black Peter, a similar being who plays a similar role for Christmas celebrations in the Netherlands.
, where men dress in taper-headed straw costume, in Kaminoyama, Yamagata
Krampus, a demonic creature, believed to accompany Saint Nicholas to punish children in some European countries during Christmas.
Ogoh-ogoh – demons of Bali who are celebrated on their new year.
Setsubun or mamemaki, practice of casting roasted soy beans to ward ogres or ghouls.
, a more ancient form of ghoul-warding passed down from China.
Askeladden - Norwegian folklore character who abides by the fireplace
Kurentovanje - Slovenian folklore carnival

Explanatory notes

References
Citations

Bibliography

External links

Japanese culture
Japanese folk art
Japanese folklore
Oga, Akita
Tourist attractions in Akita Prefecture
Yōkai
Oni